Angela Marinescu (born Basaraba-Angela Marcovici on 8 July 1941 in Arad) is a Romanian poet.

Bibliography
Her more notable works are Cocoșul s-a ascuns în tăietură (1996), Fugi postmoderne (2000), Îmi mănânc versurile (2003), Limbajul dispariției (2006), and Întâmplări derizorii de sfârșit (2006).

Her essays include Satul în care mă plimbam rasă în cap (1996) and the journal Jurnal scris în a treia parte a zilei (2004).

In September 2006 she attended the Teatrului Dramatic in Botoşani and was awarded the "Premiul Național de Poezie".

External links
Angela Marinescu - Premiul National de Poezie "Mihai Eminescu"
Angela MARINESCU în dialog cu Ioan MOLDOVAN

Romanian poets
Romanian writers
1941 births
People from Arad, Romania
Living people
Romanian women poets
Romanian women writers